Two special elections were held in  in 1827 to fill a single vacancy.

Background
In the 1827 elections, William S. Young (A) was re-elected to a 2nd term, but died on September 20, 1827 before Congress assembled.  A special election was called to fill the resultant vacancy, held on November 5, 1827

November election

The vote of one county had been thrown out, giving the election to Calhoon.  By mutual agreement of both candidates, Calhoon subsequently resigned, and both Calhoon and Chilton petitioned the Governor to call a new election, which was held on December 20, 1827.

December election

Chilton took his seat on January 11, 1828

See also
List of special elections to the United States House of Representatives

References

Kentucky 1827 11
Kentucky 1827 11
1827 11
Kentucky 11
United States House of Representatives 11
United States House of Representatives 1827 11